"Serious" is a song by English new wave band Duran Duran. It was released on 5 November 1990 as the second single from their sixth studio album, Liberty (1990), reaching number three in Italy and number 48 in the United Kingdom.

About the song
By the time the single was released, interest in the Liberty album had already waned. Poor promotion, including a decision not to tour in support of the album, led the single to stall at number 48 on the UK Singles Chart. This was the band's worst-charting single up until that point.

Music video
The black and white video, set at a circus, was directed by the duo Big TV! and features model Tess Daly. The video is a favourite among fans for the relaxed, natural attitude among the band members as they play their instruments, sometimes prompting each other into laughter. A multi-angle version of the video is available on the Greatest DVD in 2003, taking advantage of the multiple angle feature available on certain DVD players.

B-sides, bonus tracks and remixes
No remix of "Serious" was ever released; a minor edit of the album version was used on the single release. The single's primary B-side, "Yo Bad Azizi", is an experimental song built around a lyric from "Is There Something I Should Know?"; "Yo bad azizi as a nuclear war", a corruption of "You're about as easy as a nuclear war" due to the way vocalist Simon Le Bon sings the line. This was reportedly prompted by a fan's letter asking Le Bon what "yo bad azizi" meant.

The bonus B-side on the 12-inch and CD versions is "Water Babies", a remix of Liberty album track "All Along the Water". Due to pressing errors, some copies of the CD contain the original album version instead of "Water Babies".

For the US single release, two fade cuts of other Liberty album tracks were also added as B-sides, as "Yo Bad Azizi" had already been released on the American "Violence of Summer" single.

Due to the commercial failure of the "Serious" single, plans for future singles were shelved. The third single in the USA was to have been the rocker "First Impression", while Europe were to have gotten the album's title track, "Liberty". EMI's decision to cancel both singles came just days before filming began on the music video for "First Impression".

Track listing

UK 7-inch and cassette single
 "Serious" (7-inch edit) – 3:56
 "Yo Bad Azizi" – 3:03

UK 12-inch and CD single
 "Serious"
 "Yo Bad Azizi"
 "Water Babies"

US and Canadian cassette single
 "Serious"
 "Yo Bad Azizi"
 "Liberty" (fade—album edit)
 "First Impression" (fade—album edit)

The Singles 1986–1995 box set
 "Serious" (single Version) – 3:56
 "Yo Bad Azizi" – 3:03
 "Water Babies" – 5:35
 "All Along the Water" – 3:47

Personnel
 Simon Le Bon – vocals 
 Nick Rhodes – keyboards
 John Taylor – bass guitar
 Warren Cuccurullo – guitar
 Sterling Campbell – drums

Charts

Covers, samples and media references
In 2005, Dutch producer and DJ Ferry Corsten sampled "Serious" for his single "Fire." Le Bon re-recorded his vocals for the track, which is credited as "Ferry Corsten featuring Simon Le Bon".

"Serious" is featured in the soundtrack of the 1994 independent movie Twogether.

The song was planned to appear on the "Los Santos Rock Radio" station in Grand Theft Auto V, but never made it to the finished game.

References

TM's Duran Duran discography (PDF file)

1989 songs
1990 singles
Capitol Records singles
Duran Duran songs
EMI Records singles
Music videos directed by Big T.V.
Song recordings produced by Chris Kimsey
Songs written by Andy Taylor (guitarist)
Songs written by John Taylor (bass guitarist)
Songs written by Nick Rhodes
Songs written by Roger Taylor (Duran Duran drummer)
Songs written by Simon Le Bon